The 1991 New England Patriots season was the team's 32nd season, and the 22nd in the National Football League. The team finished the season with a record of six wins and ten losses, and finished fourth in the AFC East Division. Though the Patriots scored twenty or more points just five times during the season, they were able to upset playoff teams such as the Houston Oilers, Buffalo Bills and New York Jets.

It was the last season where the Patriots were owned by Victor Kiam, who was forced to sell the team to St. Louis businessman James Orthwein in order to settle a debt.

Offseason

NFL Draft

Staff

Roster

Regular season

Schedule 

Note: Intra-division opponents are in bold text.

Standings

See also 
 New England Patriots seasons

References 

New England Patriots
New England Patriots seasons
New England Patriots
Sports competitions in Foxborough, Massachusetts